"No Good 4 Me" is a song by UK garage duo Oxide & Neutrino, released as the second single from the debut album Execute. The song features other members of the So Solid Crew; Megaman, Romeo and Lisa Maffia. It reached the top 10 on the UK Singles Chart, peaking at number 6. It was the second of six non-consecutive top 20 hit singles for the duo.

"No Good 4 Me" interpolates the Prodigy's "No Good (Start the Dance)", which itself samples Kelly Charles' "You're No Good for Me", in which the chorus of this song is sung by Lisa Maffia in "No Good 4 Me".

Track listing
UK 12" single
A1. "No Good 4 Me" (Radio Edit) – 3:15
A2. "No Good 4 Me" – 6:01
B. "Foot to the Floor" – 4:52

Charts

Weekly charts

Year-end charts

References

2000 songs
2000 singles
Oxide & Neutrino songs
Romeo (English rapper) songs
Lisa Maffia songs
Songs written by Liam Howlett
East West Records singles